Fritz Gaiser (6 March 1907 – 8 June 1994) was a German cross-country skier. He competed in the men's 50 kilometre event at the 1936 Winter Olympics.

References

External links
 

1907 births
1994 deaths
German male cross-country skiers
Olympic cross-country skiers of Germany
Cross-country skiers at the 1936 Winter Olympics
20th-century German people